Yardley Wendell Griffin, Jr. is an American gospel musician, urban contemporary gospel recording artist, and worship leader. He started his music career, in 2015, with the studio album, Hear Me Now, that was released by Black Market Blue Records. This album was his breakthrough released upon the Billboard magazine charts.

Music career
His music recording career commenced in 2015, with the studio album, Hear Me Now, that was released on September 11, 2015, through Black Label Blue Records. This album was his breakthrough release upon the Billboard magazine charts, while it placed on the Gospel Albums chart, where it peaked at No. 9.

Personal life
He is currently the worship leader at Destiny Church, in Sacramento, California.

Discography

Studio albums

References

External links
Official website

Living people
African-American songwriters
African-American Christians
Musicians from Sacramento, California
Songwriters from California
21st-century African-American people
20th-century African-American people
Year of birth missing (living people)